The Berliner Festspiele (German for Berlin Festivals) are a series of festivals, art exhibitions, and other cultural events organized all year long by a common organization in Berlin. Events are held at the Haus der Berliner Festspiele, a pre-existing theatre devolved to that purpose in 2001, as well as at the Martin-Gropius-Bau and other venues.

The first of these events were the Berliner Festwochen (classical music) and the Berlin International Film Festival, in 1951. They contributed to the cultural life of West Berlin in divided Germany, before being expanded into the Eastern part of the city following Reunification.

Festivals of the Berliner Festspiele include:

MaerzMusik – Festival of Contemporary Issues, in March.
Berliner Theatertreffen, in May.
Musikfest Berlin, in September.
JazzFest Berlin, in early November.
Immersion, all year long.
Competition for young artists:
 Theatertreffen der Jugend, in late May and early June.
 Tanztreffen der Jugend, in late September.
 Treffen Junge Musik-Szene, in mid-November.
 Treffen junger Autor*innen, in late November.

References

External links
Berliner Festspiele official site
Berliner Festspiele history

Music festivals established in 1951
Organizations established in 1951
Organisations based in Berlin
Theatres in Berlin
Tourist attractions in Berlin
Music festivals in Berlin
Arts centres in Germany
1951 establishments in Germany